Shehzar Mohammad (born 12 November 1991) is a Pakistani first-class cricketer who has played for Pakistan International Airlines and Karachi Whites and a fitness trainer.

Personal life
He is the grandson of cricketer Hanif Mohammad and son of cricketer Shoaib Mohammad.

In 2021, he married actress Sohai Ali Abro.

Domestic career
In October 2018, he hit 265 for Karachi Whites against Multan at the Multan Cricket Stadium in a 2018–19 Quaid-e-Azam Trophy match. He became the sixth member of his family to hit a first-class double ton.

In September 2019, he was named in Sindh's squad for the 2019–20 Quaid-e-Azam Trophy tournament.

Fitness training
Having done certificate courses in Sports Biomechanics and CrossFit from the United States, he has opened a gym in Karachi and has trained cricketers who represented Pakistan, including Shan Masood and Azhar Ali, and also celebrities from other fields, such as actors Bilal Ashraf and Mohib Mirza.

References

External links
 

1991 births
Living people
Pakistani cricketers
Karachi Whites cricketers
Pakistan International Airlines cricketers
Pakistani people of Gujarati descent
Cricketers from Karachi